Yellow Men Sleep is a lost world novel by the American writer Jeremy Lane.  It was originally serialized in the magazine All-Story Weekly beginning on  May 3, 1919, and was first published in book form in 1919 by The Century Company.

Plot
The novel concerns the adventures of Con Levington, a Secret Service agent, who travels to the Gobi Desert searching for the source of the drug Koresh. There he discovers an ancient civilization.

Sources

1919 American novels
Lost world novels
Novels first published in serial form
American fantasy novels
Works originally published in Argosy (magazine)
The Century Company books